Hojjatabad (also Romanized as Ḩojjatābād) is a village in Tukahur Rural District, Tukahur District, Minab County, Hormozgan Province, Iran. At the 2006 census, its population was 656, in 157 families.

References 

Populated places in Minab County